Steven de Waard (born 5 May 1991) is an Australian tennis player.

De Waard has a career high ATP singles ranking of 707 achieved on 14 November 2016. He also has a career high doubles ranking of 129 achieved on 26 June 2017.

De Waard has won 1 ATP Challenger doubles title at the 2017 Internazionali di Tennis dell'Umbria.

Tour finals

Doubles

External links
 
 

1991 births
Living people
Australian male tennis players
Tennis players from Brisbane
Tennis players from Melbourne
20th-century Australian people
21st-century Australian people